Matteo Professione (born 29 November 1993 in Milan), better known as Ernia, is an Italian rapper. Together with fellow hip hop artist Ghali, he founded the crew Troupe D'Elite, also including Maite and producer Fawzi. The group released the eponymous extended play in 2012 under label Tanta Roba, and the album Il mio giorno preferito in free download under Honiro Records label, in 2014.

After the group's dissolution, he moved to London. When he came back to Italy, he debuted as a solo artist in 2017, releasing the album Come uccidere un usignolo, named after a literal translation of the title of Harper Lee's novel To Kill a Mockingbird.
One year later, his second studio album, 68, debuted at number one on the FIMI Italian Albums Chart. In 2020, he increased his fame with the album Gemelli, which became his second number-one studio set in Italy, and spawned the chart-topping single "Superclassico", certified sextuple platinum by the Federation of the Italian Music Industry.

Discography

Studio albums

External links

Notes

References

Living people
1993 births
Musicians from Milan
Italian rappers